Madeleine Larcheron (born 24 January 2006) is a French skateboarder and the reigning French National Champion in women's park skateboarding. She competed in the World Skateboarding Championship in 2019, finishing 22nd.

Larcheron is set to compete in the women's park event at the 2020 Summer Olympics in Tokyo.

Sponsors
The following companies sponsor Larcheron's skateboarding:
 Buzzz Skateshop
 Element Skateboards
 Triple8
 Vans
 Volcom
 187 Killer Pads

References

External links
 
 Madeleine Larcheron at The Boardr

Living people
2006 births
Female skateboarders
French skateboarders
French sportswomen
Olympic skateboarders of France
Skateboarders at the 2020 Summer Olympics
Sportspeople from Paris
21st-century French women